The Thing We Love is a 1918 American silent drama film starring Wallace Reid, Kathlyn Williams, and Tully Marshall, produced by Jesse Lasky, distributed by Paramount Pictures, and directed by Lou Tellegen. This marked Tellegen's second foray into directing as he usually was a leading man in front of the camera like Reid.

Cast
Wallace Reid - Rodney Sheridan
Kathlyn Williams - Margaret Kenwood
Tully Marshall - Henry D. Kenwood
Mayme Kelso - Mrs. Kenwood
Charles Ogle - Adolph Weimer
William Elmer - Kenwood's Agent (*billed Billy Elmer)

Preservation status
This film is now considered a lost film.

See also
List of lost films

References

External links
 
The Thing We Love at AllMovie

1918 films
American silent feature films
Lost American films
1918 drama films
Silent American drama films
American black-and-white films
1918 lost films
Lost drama films
Films directed by Lou Tellegen
1910s American films